Paul Dyer Merica (March 17, 1889 – October 20, 1957) was an American metallurgist, president of the International Nickel Company of Canada Ltd., now Vale Limited, inventor, and recipient of the 1938 John Fritz Medal.

Biography

Youth and education 
Merica was born in Warsaw, Indiana, to Charles Oliver Merica and Alice White Merica. After attending the Warsaw Community High School and three years at DePauw University, he obtained his AB from the University of Wisconsin in 1907.

After his graduation Merica was instructor in physics University of Wisconsin for a year, and teacher of "Western subjects" at the Chekiang Provincial College at Hangchow, China for another two years. From 1910 to 1914 he continued his studies at the University of Berlin, where he obtained his PhD in 1914.

Career and acknowledgement 
After graduation back in the States he was research physicist at the United States Bureau of Standards for five years. In 1919 he moved into the industry to the International Nickel Company, He started as Director research, and worked his way up to Technical assistant to president in 1929, and furthermore to executive vice president, president and director from 1951 until his retirement in 1955.

In 1938 Merica was awarded the John Fritz Medal, in 1941 the platinum medal of the Institute of Materials, Minerals and Mining, in 1942 the Franklin Medal by the Franklin Institute, and in 1951 the gold medal of the American Society for Metals.

On October 29, 1964, the International Nickel Company dedicated a new research center, called the Paul D. Merica Research Laboratory, in Sterling Forest, New York.

Publications 
 Paul Dyer Merica. Ueber Beziehungen zwischen den mechanischen und den magnetischen Eigenschaften einiger Metalle bei elastischen und plastischen Formänderungen, 1914.
 George Kimball Burgess, Paul Dyer Merica. An investigation of fusible tin boiler plugs, 1915.
 Paul Dyer Merica. A simplification of the inverse-rate method for thermal analysis, 1919.
 Paul Dyer Merica, Romaine George Waltenberg. Malleability and metallography of nickel, 1925.
 Paul Dyer Merica. "Personalities in Industry," Scientific American. July 1, 1938.
 Paul Dyer Merica. Charles Holmes Herty, Jr., 1896-1953, 1958.

Patents, a selection
 "Patent US1811696 - Carbon-free metal," 1931
 "Patent US2048163 - Iron-nickel-titanium alloy," 1936.
 "Patent US2048164 - Method of treating alloys," 1936.

References 

1889 births
1957 deaths
Engineers from Indiana
American metallurgists
DePauw University alumni
University of Wisconsin–Madison alumni
Humboldt University of Berlin alumni
People from Warsaw, Indiana
John Fritz Medal recipients
20th-century American inventors